Elodimyia is a genus of parasitic flies in the family Tachinidae.

Species
Elodimyia tricincta Mesnil, 1952

Distribution
Lesser Sunda Islands.

References

Monotypic Brachycera genera
Diptera of Asia
Exoristinae
Tachinidae genera